Sociology of architecture is the sociological study of  the built environment and the role and occupation of architects in modern societies.

Architecture is basically constituted of the aesthetic, the engineering and the social aspects. The built environment which is made up of designed spaces and the activities of people are inter-related and inseparable. It is for us to understand this interrelationship and put it down appropriately on paper.
Social institutions are many and these social institutions sometimes need functional spaces to allow the people using the building to benefit from all aspects of both, the purpose of what inhabits the building and by the varied structure and organized flow of communication. The way the buildings are designed to fulfill the needs of these social institutions /social requirements can be said to be the compliance of social aspects in architecture.

Cultural sociology
Architecture is the visual shape ("Gestalt") of society, and within that, all the various building types (architecture of consumption, of mobility, of the political and religious, as well as factories, prisons, cinema buildings, etc.) could become objects of architectural sociology. For example: how a specific architecture 'expresses' the structure and principles of a given society.

Classical sociology of architecture
Such sociological analysis of architecture can be found in the classic authors of sociology in Marcel Mauss, Walter Benjamin, Norbert Elias, Michel Foucault, Ernst Bloch, Siegfried Kracauer, Pierre Bourdieu, Maurice Halbwachs, Karel Teige and others.

Sociology of architectonic artifacts
The sociology of technology offers approaches to a sociology of (architectonic) artifacts. Initially, this sociology is interested in technical matters. While buildings (as art and technic) are not in the core of this discipline. The perspective of architecture as artifact would be the question of 'interactions' between architecture and subject: how a very specific architecture suggests certain ways, movements, perceptions.

Urban sociology and sociology of space
The term "social space" is used by Pierre Bourdieu and others (in contrast to architecture or built environment) in a more abstract sense: as social constituted spatial structures. Georg Simmel founded such a sociology of space and always watched the architecture of society.

Simmel unfolded also an urban sociology (his articles were read in Chicago school): in his question of the specific ways of life in big cities ( "Big cities and life of spirit", 1903). Urban sociology primarily deals with social structures within the city: their points are for instance processes of segregation, urbanization and the decline of cities. Recently, there is a research focus on "differences of cities", which will be more associated with a sociology of architecture. Ronald Daus is introducing new concepts in this area, studying the history of extra-European Megacities..

See also 
 Urban vitality

References

Paul Jones, The Sociology of Architecture: Constructing Identities, Liverpool University Press 2010 (in print).
Leslie Sklair, "The Icon Project: Architecture, Cities, and Capitalist Globalization", Oxford University Press, New York, 2017. 
Heike Delitz, Gebaute Gesellschaft. Architektur als Medium des Sozialen, Frankfurt/M., New York 2010.
Heike Delitz, Architektursoziologie. Reihe Einsichten. Themen der Soziologie, Bielefeld 2009.
Joachim Fischer/Heike Delitz (eds.), Die Architektur der Gesellschaft. Theorien für die Architektursoziologie, Bielefeld: transcript 2009.
 Olivier Chadoin, Etre architecte : les vertus de l'indétermination - de la sociologie d'une profession à la sociologie du travail professionnel, Presses Universitaires de Limoges, 2007.
Heike Delitz, Die Architektur der Gesellschaft. Architektur und Architekturtheorie im Blick der Soziologie, in: Wolkenkuckucksheim - Cloud-Cuckoo-Land - Vozdushnyi zamok. Internationale ZS für Theorie und Wissenschaft der Architektur, 10. Jg. H. 1 (Sept. 2006): »From Outer Space: Architekturtheorie außerhalb der Disziplin« (http://www.tu-cottbus.de/BTU/Fak2/TheoArch/Wolke/deu/Themen/051/Delitz/delitz.htm).
Herbert Schubert, Empirische Architektursoziologie, in: Die alte Stadt 1/2005, 1-27
Joachim Fischer/ Michael Makropoulos (Hg.), Potsdamer Platz. Soziologische Theorien zu einem Ort der Moderne, München 2004
Bernhard Schäfers, Architektursoziologie, Opladen (Leske + Budrich) 2003 
 Gieryn, Thomas: What Buildings do, in: Theory and Society 31 (2002), 35-74
Guy Ankerl, Experimental Sociology of Architecture. A Guide to Theory, Research and Literature, Mouton de Gruyter Publ. (The Hague, Paris, New York)549 p. 1983  (paper) Hardcover .
Anthony D. King (ed.), Buildings and Society: Essays on the Social Development of the Built Environment, London 1980
Robert Gutman, "Architecture from the Outside In: Selected Essays by Robert Gutman (ed. Dana Cuff, John Wriedt), Princeton Architectural Press, 2010. "People and Buildings" (ed. Robert Gutman, Nathan Glazer), Transaction Publishers, 2009. "Architectural Practice: A Critical View," Princeton Architectural Press; 5th edition, 1997.
 www.architektur-soziologie.de task force Sociology of architecture in the German Sociological Association
 Espaces et Sociétés « Sociologie et architecture : matériau pour une comparaison européenne », Olivier Chadoin et Viviane Claude (Coord), n°142, juin 2010. 
 Chadoin Olivier, « Le sociologue chez les architectes – Matériau pour une sociologie de la sociologie en situation ancillaire », Sociétés contemporaines, n°3/75, 2009. 
 Chadoin Olivier, "Sociologie de l'architecture et des architectes", Marseille, Editions Parnthèses, 2021.

 
Environmental design
Environmental sociology